Pali is a Middle Indo-Aryan language.

Pali may also refer to:

Buddhism
Pāli Canon, a collection of early Canonical Buddhist scriptures
Pali Atthakatha, Pali commentaries on the Pali Canon
Pali Paracanonical texts (Theravada Buddhism), inspirational and devotional texts in Pali

Places

Canada
Pali Dome, a volcano in British Columbia, Canada

China
 Pagri (Pàlǐ zhèn in Chinese), a town in southern Tibet near Sikkim and Bhutan

Hungary
 Páli, a village in Győr-Moson-Sopron county

India
 Pali, Haryana, a village in Rewari district of Haryana state
 Pali, Umaria, a town in Madhya Pradesh, India
 Pali, Karjat, a village in the Raigad district  of Maharashtra
 Pali Village, an urban village in Bandra suburb of Mumbai
 Pali, Raigad, a town in Maharashtra, India
 Pali, a village in Thane district, Maharashtra
 Pali district, in Rajasthan, India
 Pali, Rajasthan, a town in Pali District, Rajasthan, India
 Pali (Lok Sabha constituency)
 Pali (Rajasthan Assembly constituency)
 Pali, Hardoi, a town in Uttar Pradesh, India
 Pali, Raebareli, a village in Uttar Pradesh, India
 Pali, Lalitpur, a town in Uttar Pradesh, India
 Pali, Jaunpur, a village in Uttar Pradesh, India
Ali Nagar Pali, a village in Bihar, India

Montenegro
Pali, Montenegro, a village in Bijelo Polje

Nepal
 Pali, Nepal, a small town in Arghakhanchi District

United States
 Pali Highway (Hawaii Route 61), a scenic highway in Hawaii
 Nu‘uanu Pali, a region on the Hawaiian island of Oʻahu
 Nā Pali Coast, an area on the northern coast of the Hawaiian island of Kauai
 Palo Alto, California is sometimes referred to as "Pali"

Taiwan
 Bali District, a district in New Taipei City, formerly romanized as "Pali"

People
Zoltan Pali (born 1960), American architect based in Los Angeles, California

Sports
Pali Blues, a United Soccer Leagues W-League club based in Pacific Palisades, Los Angeles
Pali Blues (PDL), the United Soccer Leagues Premier Development League "brother" club of the team above

In fiction
Dr. Charles Pali, alter ego alias of pulp magazine character Jethro Dumont as the Green Lama

Other uses
Pali, a nickname describing either Palestine or Palestinians
Pali, the short name or nickname of Palisades Charter High School, a school in Los Angeles, California
Neoliberal Party (PALI), a Nicaraguan political party
Pali language (Chadic), a West Chadic language of Nigeria
Hurricane Pali, a 2016 Pacific storm
Ballaleshwar Pali, a temple in Raigad district, in India